The 2019 New York Open was a men's tennis tournament played on indoor hard courts. It was the second edition of the New York Open, and part of the ATP Tour 250 series of the 2019 ATP Tour. It took place in Uniondale, New York, United States, at the Nassau Veterans Memorial Coliseum from February 11 through 17, 2019.

Singles main-draw entrants

Seeds 

 1 Rankings are as of February 4, 2019.

Other entrants 
The following players received wildcards into the singles main draw:
  Jack Mingjie Lin
  Noah Rubin
  Frances Tiafoe

The following players received entry from the qualifying draw:
  Christopher Eubanks 
  Adrián Menéndez Maceiras 
  Ramkumar Ramanathan
  Brayden Schnur

The following player received entry as a lucky loser:
  Alexei Popyrin

Withdrawals
Before the tournament
  Kevin Anderson → replaced by  Peter Polansky
  Alex de Minaur → replaced by  Lukáš Lacko
  Bradley Klahn → replaced by  Alexei Popyrin
  Feliciano López → replaced by  Guillermo García López
  Michael Mmoh → replaced by  Paolo Lorenzi

Retirements
  Denis Istomin

Doubles main-draw entrants

Seeds 

 1 Rankings are as of February 4, 2019.

Other entrants 
The following pairs received wildcards into the doubles main draw:
  Brendan Evans /  John Isner
  Lleyton Hewitt /  Alexei Popyrin

The following pairs received entry as alternates:
  Paolo Lorenzi /  Peter Polansky
  Tennys Sandgren /  Jackson Withrow

Withdrawals 
Before the tournament
  Bradley Klahn

Champions

Singles 

  Reilly Opelka def.  Brayden Schnur, 6–1, 6–7(7–9), 7–6(9–7)

Doubles 

  Kevin Krawietz /  Andreas Mies def.  Santiago González /  Aisam-ul-Haq Qureshi, 6–4, 7–5

References

External links 

New York Open (tennis)
New York Open
New York Open
2019 in American tennis
2019 in sports in New York (state)